Eric Blakeney (born September 14, 1959) is an American film and television director, producer and screenwriter. He is known for writing award-winning episodes of television for 21 Jump Street, and writing and directing a feature film, 2000's Gun Shy.

Biography
Blakeney was born in Manhattan, New York. He lived there until 1977, when he moved to London, England. After performing as a member of various London rock groups, Blakeney returned to the US, this time settling in Los Angeles, California. Blakeney wrote for various print publications, until he found his calling - and his first writing job - in television on Crime Story.

Based on the strength of his work on Crime Story and Moonlighting, Blakeney was hired as a story editor on Wiseguy, until becoming a senior writer. During this time, he was also nominated for an Edgar Award  for his work on Wiseguy - specifically, the episode "The Marriage of Heaven and Hell". He later became the show runner for 21 Jump Street, starring Johnny Depp, and later created the spin-off series Booker, starring Richard Grieco.

After working in television, Blakeney wrote and directed his first film - Gun Shy, starring Liam Neeson and Sandra Bullock.

References

External links
 

American television directors
American male screenwriters
Living people
People from the Bronx
1959 births
Film directors from New York City
Screenwriters from New York (state)